Ahmad Ersan Mohammad Hamdouni (born 28 September 1995) is a Jordanian footballer who plays as an attacking midfielder for Kazma and the Jordan national team. He is known for his speed, ability to shoot and dribbling.

Career

Ersan was included in Jordan's squad for the 2019 AFC Asian Cup in the United Arab Emirates.

Career statistics

International

International goals
Scores and results list Jordan's goal tally first.

References

External links
 
 
 
 

1995 births
Living people
People from Irbid
Jordanian footballers
Jordan international footballers
Jordan youth international footballers
Association football midfielders
Mansheyat Bani Hasan players
Al-Faisaly SC players
Shabab Al-Aqaba Club players
Kazma SC players
Jordanian expatriate footballers
Jordanian expatriate sportspeople in Kuwait
Expatriate footballers in Kuwait
2019 AFC Asian Cup players